Panthea is a genus of the owlet moth family. 

Panthea may also refer to:

People
Julia Drusilla (16–38), a member of the Roman imperial family, given the title of "Panthea" upon her death
Panthea, mistress of Lucius Verus (130–169), co-emperor of Ancient Rome
Panthea, pen name of Sophia Dobson Collet (1822–1894), English feminist freethinker
Panthea Grant Boone, second wife of Lilburn Boggs, sixth Governor of Missouri

Fictional characters
Panthea, in the Jacobean stage play A King and No King
Panthea, in the lyrical drama Prometheus Unbound by Shelley
Panthea, in the 1953 American film Slaves of Babylon
Lady Panthea Vyne, in the UK television movie The Lady and the Highwayman
Panthea Vyse, in the audio drama The Diet of Worms
Queen Panthea, antagonist of the CGI animated television series Mia and Me

Other uses
Panthea (film), a 1917 American silent drama film
Panthea; or, the Captive bride, a tragedy, a 1789 work by Thomas Maurice

See also
Pantheon (disambiguation)